Albert Reed Jr. (January 28, 1910May 31, 1986) was an American actor and law enforcement officer. He was mostly known for his recurring role as Alderman Fred C. Davis on Good Times. He also had a recurring role on the children's adventure series The Secret of Isis as Dr. Joshua Barnes and made guest appearances on The Jeffersons and Sanford and Son. On Sanford and Son, he appeared in the role of Grady Wilson, a cousin of Fred's, a part he played for just one episode; another role that involved a character named Grady Wilson, a longtime friend of Fred's, would later go to actor Whitman Mayo. He portrayed "Lieutenant Ned Ordway" in the original Airport movie (1970), a case of art imitating life, as Reed was also an airport law enforcement official.

Outside of his acting career, Reed also served with the Security Division at Los Angeles International Airport from 1959 to 1983, ending his career as the Chief of Security, 1979–1983. (The Security Division later grew into what is now known as the "Los Angeles Airport Police.")

Filmography

References

External links
 

1910 births
1986 deaths
Male actors from Texas
Male actors from California
American male television actors
African-American male actors
20th-century American male actors
20th-century African-American people